Stuchd an Lochain ('peak of the little lake') is a mountain in the Breadalbane region of the southern Scottish Highlands. It lies at the western end of Glen Lyon and forms the southern side of Loch an Daimh. The summit sits above a large corrie that contains a small lake called Lochan na Cat. 

The primary route to the summit leaves from the eastern end of Loch an Daimh and climbs the ridge to the top of Sron Chona Choirein.  From here the ridge turns roughly north for a short distance before turning north-west to the summit.  Fit walkers can continue west for a circular walk around the loch taking in a Corbett, Sròn a' Choire Chnapanich, and another Munro, Meall Buidhe.

References

Munros
Marilyns of Scotland
Mountains and hills of the Southern Highlands
Mountains and hills of Stirling (council area)